Whitehorse Water Aerodrome  is located on Schwatka Lake,  south of Whitehorse, Yukon, Canada.

The airport is classified as an airport of entry by Nav Canada and is staffed by the Canada Border Services Agency. CBSA officers at this airport can handle general aviation aircraft only, with no more than 15 passengers.

References

Registered aerodromes in Yukon
Transport in Whitehorse
Seaplane bases in Yukon